Roknabad (also Romanized as Roknābād; also known as Ruenābād and Ruknābād) is a village in, and the capital of, Shohada Rural District of the Central District of Meybod County, Yazd province, Iran. At the 2006 National Census, its population was 1,894 in 506 households. The following census in 2011 counted 2,579 people in 726 households. The latest census in 2016 showed a population of 2,324 people in 698 households; it was the largest village in its rural district.

References 

Meybod County

Populated places in Yazd Province

Populated places in Meybod County